Blessing a Curse was an American metal band formed in Orlando, Florida and currently signed to Smartpunk Records. Formed in 2013, they have released one studio album and two EPs to date. Their first album, Satisfaction for the Vengeful was released in stores and online November 4, 2016 through Smartpunk Records. All songs written by Andrew Wade and Blessing A Curse.

Members 
 Joshy Singer – Lead Vocals
 Ronnie Mitchell – Bass/Vocals
 Brandon Swanson –  Lead Guitar
 Jordan Crain - Rhythm Guitar
 Pedro Rentas – Drums

Discography

Studio albums

Extended plays

Singles

Music videos

References

External links 
 

American post-hardcore musical groups
Musical groups from Orlando, Florida
Musical groups established in 2013
2013 establishments in Florida